Adam Bert may refer to:

Adam K. Bert (1905–2007), American philatelist
Adam Cornelius Bert